Nicholas Andre Carpenter  is an American film director. He worked as a set production assistant on TV and on films such as Thank You for Smoking (2005) before going on to direct the 2009 horror anthology The Telling.

Early life
Nicholas Carpenter is the son of Scott Carpenter, one of the original Mercury astronauts, and Maria Roach Carpenter, daughter of film producer Hal Roach. Carpenter has a brother, Matthew Scott; four half-siblings from his father's first marriage, Marc Scott, Kristen Elaine, Candace Noxon and Robyn Jay; and a half sibling from his father's third marriage, Zachary Scott. Carpenter grew up in Los Angeles, where his father made his home after retiring from NASA in 1969.

Personal life
In 2015, Carpenter became engaged to longtime girlfriend Bridget Marquardt.

References

External links
 

Living people
Nicholas
Place of birth missing (living people)
Year of birth missing (living people)
Film directors from Los Angeles